Better Days is the fourth studio album by Belgian singer-songwriter Tom Dice. It was released in Belgium through Universal Music Belgium on 30 March 2018. The album reached number 15 in Belgium. The album includes the singles "Cannonball" and "Better Days".

Singles
"Cannonball" was released as the lead single from the album on 20 October 2017. "Better Days" was released as the second single from the album on 2 March 2018.

Track listing

Chart performance

Weekly charts

Release history

References

2018 albums
Tom Dice albums